Gabriele Tarquini (born 2 March 1962) is an Italian racing driver.  He participated in 78 Formula One Grands Prix, debuting on May 3, 1987.  He scored a single championship point, and holds the record for the most failed attempts to qualify. He has subsequently raced successfully in Touring Cars, winning the BTCC in 1994, the ETCC in 2003  the WTCC in 2009 and the WTCR in 2018.

On 22 November 2009 he won the 2009 FIA World Touring Car Championship title at the age of 47 years and 266 days. This made him the oldest ever world champion in an FIA series, breaking Juan Manuel Fangio's record of being FIA Formula One World Drivers' Champion at the age of 46 years and 41 days in 1957. Tarquini backed up this record by winning the 2018 FIA World Touring Car Cup at the age of 56 years and 259 days.

Formula One 
Tarquini began karting in 1976. By 1985 he was driving in Formula 3000, spending three seasons with underfunded outfits. His best result was 2nd at Imola in 1987, by which time he had already made his Grand Prix debut in a one-off drive for Osella at the 1987 San Marino Grand Prix.

He joined Coloni's Grand Prix team for 1988, having driven for them in F3000 in 1986. The season saw a prequalifying system being put in place as there were 31 entrants for a maximum 30 places in qualifying proper. As such, the slowest of the new entrants for the season (Coloni, Rial, Dallara and EuroBrun) would be eliminated from proceedings after the Friday morning session regardless of their overall position - Tarquini failed to prequalify several times despite often being faster than some of the exempt entrants (such as the Osella and Zakspeed cars). He drew good notices for his performance overall, however - his 8th place at the Canadian Grand Prix would stand as the team's best ever result and his eight starts the most ever garnered by a Coloni driver.

Tarquini signed to drive for the FIRST team (again a former employer in F3000) and drove for them at the Formula One Indoor Trophy, but when their car failed crash tests he started 1989 without a ride. Following Philippe Streiff's career-ending pre-season testing crash, Tarquini joined Joachim Winkelhock in the AGS team from the second round of the series. There he finished a fine 8th on the road, being promoted to 6th after the exclusion of Thierry Boutsen and Alex Caffi. He was then one of the stars of the weekend in Monaco, threatening to qualify in the top 6 before ending up 13th on the grid. In the race he advanced to a strong 4th before being sidelined by an electrical problem. At the following Mexican Grand Prix he finished 6th, though the team's joy was tempered after Williams and Scuderia Italia successfully appealed against their Imola disqualification and Tarquini lost his point. More bad luck followed at Phoenix where Tarquini was holding 6th despite technical problems before Boutsen passed him on the final lap. At the wet Canadian Grand Prix Tarquini again ran well until being shoved off the track by René Arnoux (who eventually went on to finish 5th). The series then moved to faster tracks where the AGS was less competitive and the results of others meant Tarquini's entry (exempt for the first half of the season thanks to Streiff's efforts in 1988) would have to prequalify for the second half of the season.

The expanding entry list meant prequalifying was very different from 1988, consisting of an hour-long free-for-all session on Friday morning between the less successful cars. Featuring the Larrousse cars of Michele Alboreto and Philippe Alliot, Roberto Moreno's Coloni, the Osellas of Nicola Larini and Piercarlo Ghinzani and the Onyx cars of Stefan Johansson and Bertrand Gachot among others with only the four fastest going through both Tarquini and new teammate Yannick Dalmas struggled and Tarquini would not qualify again that year.

AGS attempted to move to larger premises for 1990 but a lack of resources and the late arrival of the JH25 left Tarquini and Dalmas again struggling to get past prequalifying, Tarquini only making it into four races (finishing just once - 13th in the Hungarian Grand Prix), his early 1989 form long forgotten by most. The team were under even more severe financial constraints for 1991, though they would initially at least avoid prequalifying. Tarquini made it through into three races, finishing a worthy 8th in the season opener at Phoenix but financial constraints meant after Monaco the AGS didn't make the grid again.

Late in the season the cash-strapped team sold his contract to Gabriele Rumi's ambitious Fondmetal outfit in time for the Spanish Grand Prix, soon forming a good relationship with the team. He was signed for a full year in 1992, showing some good speed in the neat but underdeveloped Fondmetal GR02 chassis. However, his car only finished once (14th at Silverstone, hindered by clutch problems) and despite some fine qualifying efforts (including outqualifying Ivan Capelli's Ferrari in Belgium) the team struggled to find funding, folding after the following Italian Grand Prix and leaving Tarquini out of a drive.

Despite being firmly involved in his successful touring cars career and 33 years old, Tarquini was signed up by Tyrrell for the 1995 season as their test driver thanks to the presence of Fondmetal as a sponsor. He replaced Ukyo Katayama for the European round as the Japanese driver was injured from his start line accident in the previous race. Out of practice with single seaters (having done very little actual testing due to the team's financial constraints) he finished 14th, six laps down on winner Michael Schumacher. It was his final Grand Prix.

Tarquini failed to pre-qualify on a record 25 occasions (out of a total of 40 failures to qualify), mainly because he was a regular in the pre-qualifying era, usually in cars which were so slow as to struggle to qualify. Despite this record many consider him to have been a talented driver stuck with uncompetitive machinery (much like contemporary Roberto Moreno).

Touring Cars

Italian Superturismo 1993

Alfa Romeo (1993)
With the creation of D2 series in 1993, Tarquini passed to Alfa Romeo becoming their top driver and finishing third in Italian Superturismo behind Ravaglia and Giovanardi.

BTCC 1994/1995

Alfa Romeo (1994-1995)

The following year Tarquini moved to the British Touring Car Championship, winning the title at his first attempt in an Alfa Romeo featuring controversial aerodynamic enhancements. In 1995 Alfa Corse decided to move him back to Italian Superturismo Championship but after 2 victories, 4 third place and 6 DNF, Tarquini left the series and joined to Prodrive to help Alfa Romeo to achieve better results in BTCC.

ITC 1996

Alfa Romeo (1996)
In 1996 Tarquini raced in Class 1 Touring Cars with Alfa Romeo in ITC, where he achieved best results of 1 victory and 1 second place.

BTCC 1997

Honda (1997)
With the end of D1 Class, Tarquini left Alfa Romeo and signed a 5 year contract with Honda where he raced in BTCC again with Prodrive. The first season with Honda saw him finishing 6th in the general standings with 1 victory, 1 second and 3 third places.

STW 1998/1999

Honda (1998-1999)
In 1998 and 1999 Tarquini raced in Germany with JAS Motorsport in STW Cup where he got 2 victories and several podium.

BTCC 2000

Honda (2000)
After 2 years in Germany, Tarquini raced for the third time in BTCC.

Euro STC 2001

Honda (2001)
In his last season with Honda he raced in Euro STC where he finished third behind the 2 Alfa Romeo of Giovanardi and Larini although he got 9 victories.

ETCC 2003/2004
After spending 2002 without a car, in 2003 he came back to Alfa Romeo where he raced in the ETCC and he won the title at the first attempt as it happened 9 years before in BTCC. In 2004 for the last season of ETCC he was again the best of Alfa's driver and he finished third behind the 2 BMW of Priaulx and Dirk Muller.

WTCC

Alfa Romeo (2005)
He remained with Alfa Romeo as the ETCC became the World Touring Car Championship (WTCC) in 2005. He finished seventh overall, with two victories.

SEAT Sport (2006–2009)
In November 2005, Tarquini was confirmed as one of six drivers at SEAT Sport for 2006. He finished fifth in the championship that year with one win. He finished 8th in the standings in 2007, once again winning just one race. 2008 saw considerable improvement for Tarquini as he finished runner-up in the championship to Yvan Muller winning three races. His biggest success of his career came in 2009 when he won the WTCC championship at the last race of the year in Macau.

Sunred (2010–2011)

SEAT withdrew from the WTCC for 2010, but provided funding to introduce the new semi-works SR-Sport team, with whom Tarquini attempted to retain his crown. He scored five wins during the season to finish runner-up to ex-SEAT Sport teammate Yvan Muller in the drivers standings. This was after four victories, plus an inherited victory in Belgium from Jordi Gene after Gene's disqualification. His crash in Japan race two ended his title hopes.

In 2011, Tarquini drove for the Lukoil-SUNRED team alongside Aleksei Dudukalo. He started the year with the SEAT 2.0 TDI engine but switched to the SUNRED 1.6T for Brno onwards. He finished the season 5th in the standings with just one win in a year dominated by the Chevrolet RML team.

Lukoil Racing (2012)
In January 2012 it was confirmed that Tarquini would drive for Lukoil Racing in a SEAT León powered by the new SEAT Sport turbocharged engine. His teammate will once again be Aleksei Dudukalo. He started from pole position at the first race of the season in Italy but finished third behind Yvan Muller and Rob Huff in race one, he retired from the second race. Contact with Huff in race two in Portugal left him 19th with damage although no penalties were applied.

Honda (2013–2015)
In July 2012, it was confirmed that Tarquini would drive a factory supported Honda Civic run by the returning JAS Motorsport team, alongside Tiago Monteiro in 2013. He qualified fifth for the season opening Race of Italy but was given a five–place grid penalty for race one having tapped René Münnich into a spin during qualifying. He finished race one in fourth and race two in third. He gave the Honda team its first pole position in the WTCC at the Race of Morocco. He finished second in race one but retired from race two when he lost control over one of the kerbs and collided with Alex MacDowall.

Lada (2016)

In his last season of WTCC he moved to the uncompetitive Lada team where he was able to score 2 victories.

WTCR

Hyundai (2018-2021)
After spending the entire 2017 to develop the new Hyundai I30N, Tarquini raced in the new WTCR after the fusion between WTCC and Internation TCR. The 2018 saw him again protagonist and after an incredible battle with Muller he won his fourth title after BTCC, ETCC and WTCC. He announced his retirement from racing at the 2021 Race of Italy

In a poll conducted by Motorsport Magazine in 2005, Tarquini was voted the 11th greatest touring car driver ever.

Racing record

Career summary

† As Tarquini was a guest driver, he was ineligible for points.

Complete International Formula 3000 results
(key) (Races in bold indicate pole position; races in italics indicate fastest lap.)

† — Did not finish the race, but was classified as he completed over 90% of the race distance.

Complete 24 Hours of Le Mans results

Complete Formula One results
(key) (Races in bold indicate pole position; races in italics indicate fastest lap.)

† Did not finish, but was classified as he had completed more than 90% of the race distance.

Complete British Touring Car Championship results
(key) (Races in bold indicate pole position – 1 point awarded 1996 onwards all races) (Races in italics indicate fastest lap) (* signifies that driver lead feature race for at least one lap – 1 point given 1998 onwards)

‡ Retired before second start of race

Complete Deutsche Tourenwagen Meisterschaft results
(key) (Races in bold indicate pole position) (Races in italics indicate fastest lap)

Complete International Touring Car Championship results
(key) (Races in bold indicate pole position) (Races in italics indicate fastest lap)

† — Did not finish the race, but was classified as he completed over 90% of the race distance.

Complete Super Tourenwagen Cup results
(key) (Races in bold indicate pole position) (Races in italics indicate fastest lap)

Complete European Touring Car Championship results
(key) (Races in bold indicate pole position) (Races in italics indicate fastest lap)

Complete World Touring Car Championship results
(key) (Races in bold indicate pole position) (Races in italics indicate fastest lap)

† Did not finish the race, but was classified as he completed over 90% of the race distance.

Complete World Touring Car Cup results
(key) (Races in bold indicate pole position) (Races in italics indicate fastest lap)

† Driver did not finish the race, but was classified as he completed over 90% of the race distance.

Complete Scandinavian Touring Car Championship results
(key) (Races in bold indicate pole position) (Races in italics indicate fastest lap)

Complete TCR International Series results
(key) (Races in bold indicate pole position) (Races in italics indicate fastest lap)

‡ As Tarquini was a guest driver, he was ineligible to score points.

References

External links

 

1962 births
Living people
Italian racing drivers
Italian Formula One drivers
AGS Formula One drivers
Coloni Formula One drivers
Osella Formula One drivers
FIRST Racing Formula One drivers
Fondmetal Formula One drivers
Tyrrell Formula One drivers
British Touring Car Championship drivers
British Touring Car Championship Champions
World Touring Car Championship drivers
World Touring Car Champions
Italian Formula Three Championship drivers
International Formula 3000 drivers
24 Hours of Le Mans drivers
TC 2000 Championship drivers
European Touring Car Championship drivers
World Sportscar Championship drivers
24 Hours of Spa drivers
People from Giulianova
World Touring Car Cup drivers
24H Series drivers
Sportspeople from the Province of Teramo
Karting World Championship drivers
Prema Powerteam drivers
Hyundai Motorsport drivers
Cupra Racing drivers
Engstler Motorsport drivers
TCR Europe Touring Car Series drivers